The Susu people are a Mande-speaking ethnic group living primarily in Guinea and Northwestern Sierra Leone, particularly in Kambia District. Influential in Guinea, smaller communities of Susu people are also found in the neighboring Guinea-Bissau and Senegal.

The Susu are a patrilineal society, predominantly Muslim, who favor endogamous cross-cousin marriages with polygynous households. They have a caste system like all Manding-speaking peoples of West Africa. The artisans such as smiths, carpenters, musicians, jewelers, and leatherworkers are separate castes and believed to have descended from the medieval era of slavery.

The Susu people are also referred to as Soosoo, Sossoé, Sosoe, Sosso, Soso, Sousou, Susso, Sussu, or Soussou.

Demographics and language

Their language, called Sosoxui by native speakers, serves as a major trade language along the Guinean coast, particularly in its southwest, including the capital city of Conakry. It belongs to the Niger-Congo family of languages.

In the old Susu language, "Guinea" means woman and this is the derivation for the country's name.

Ethnonymy
The meaning of the name "Soso or Susu" apparently derived from "Susuwi," meaning "horse" or "horseman" in the Susu language. The terms "Sawsaws," "Souses," and "Sussias" are all English corruptions of "Susu," rarer variants of their name are also encountered such as Souzo, Sossé, Suzées, Socé, Caxi, Saxi, Saxe, and even as Sexi.

History

The Susu are descendants of their Manding ancestors who lived in the mountainous Mali-Guinea border. They are said to have originally been a section of the Soninke people that migrated out of Wagadou and were initially a clan of blacksmiths who displayed their clear intentions to object converting to Islam. In the twelfth century, when Ancient Ghana was in decline, they migrated south and established a capital city of Soso in the mountainous region of Koulikoro. The Susu were once ruled by Sumanguru Kanté, but after that, they were ruled by the thirteenth century Mali Empire. In the fifteenth century, they migrated west to the Fouta Djallon plateau of Guinea, as the Mali empire disintegrated. The close familiarity with the Yalunka people suggest a hypothesis that they were once members of the same group in the Fouta Djallon, separated by Fula invaders, and that the Susu moved southward absorbing other people in the process. The Susu people were traditionally animist .

The Fula people dominated the region from the Fouta Djallon. The Fulani created an Islamic theocracy, thereafter began slave raids as a part of Jihad that impacted many West African ethnic groups including the Susu people. In particular, states Ismail Rashid, the Jihad effort of Fulani elites starting in the 1720s theologically justified enslavement of the non-Islamic people and also led to successful conversion of previously animist peoples to Islam. The political environment led the Susu people to convert to Islam in the seventeenth and eighteenth century, along with further westward and southward migration towards the plains of Guinea.

The colonial-era Europeans arrived in the Guinea region of resident Susu people in the late eighteenth century for trade, but got politically involved during the era of Temne wars that attacked the Susu people along with other ethnic groups. While Temne sought British support, the Susu sought the French. The region split, with Temne speaking Sierra Leone regions going with the British colonial empire, and Susu speaking Guinea regions becoming a part of the French colonial empire in the late nineteenth century during the Scramble for Africa.

Society and culture

The Susu live with their extended family.  Polygyny is an accepted practice since Islamic law allows men to have as many as four wives.  This is not always practiced because having multiple wives requires more means than most men have. The men provide for their families by working the rice fields, fishing, or engaging in trade. The women cook the food and take care of the children. They often engage in small commerce, usually of vegetables they have raised in their garden. Often women will have their room or hut next to their husband's lodging where they will stay with their children. 

Over 99% of Susu are Muslim, and Islam dominates their religious culture and practices. Most Islamic holidays are observed, the most important being the celebration that follows Ramadan (a month of prayer and fasting). The Susu people, like other Manding-speaking peoples, have a caste system regionally referred to by terms such as Nyamakala, Naxamala and Galabbolalauba. According to David Conrad and Barbara Frank, the terms and social categories in this caste-based social stratification system of Susu people shows cases of borrowing from Arabic only, but the likelihood is that these terms are linked to Latin, Greek or Aramaic.

The artisans among the Susu people, such as smiths, carpenters, musicians, and bards (Yeliba), jewelers, and leatherworkers, are separate castes. The Susu people believe that these castes have descended from the medieval era slaves. The Susu castes are not limited to Guinea, but are found in other regions where Susu people live, such as in Sierra Leone where too they are linked to the historic slavery system that existed in the region, states Daniel Harmon. The Susu castes in the regional Muslim communities were prevalent and recorded by sociologists in the late nineteenth and early twentieth centuries.

Some Susu combine their Islamic faith with traditional beliefs, such as the existence of spirits who inhabit certain areas, and the belief in sorcerers who have the power to change into animals, cast evil spells on people, or heal people from certain ailments.

The Susu people also utilize practices of the Bondo secret society which aims at gradually but firmly  establishing attitudes related to adulthood in girls, discussions on fertility, morality and proper sexual comportment. The society also maintains an interest in the well-being of its members throughout their lives.

The Susu are primarily farmers, with rice and millet being their two principal crops. Mangoes, pineapples, and coconuts are also grown. The Susu are also known as skilled traders and blacksmiths. The women make various kinds of palm oil from palm nuts. Ancient Susu houses were typically made of either mud or cement blocks, depending on the resources available.

Susu patronyms
Some common Susu surnames are:

Conté
Yansané
Fofana
Sylla or Sillah
Soumah
Bangoura
Yattara
Sankhon
Youla
Daffé
Cissé
Camara
Touré
Diarso
Diarisso

Notable Susu people

Political figures
Amara Bangoura, Guinean diplomat
Elhadj Aly Jamal Bangoura, current Secretary General of Religious Affairs of Guinea
Fodé Bangoura, Guinean politician and former Minister Secretary General to President Lansana Conté
Karim Bangoura, Guinean diplomat
Kiridi Bangoura, Guinean politician
Mafory Bangoura, was a radical activist for the independence of Guinea
Mahawa Bangoura, Guinean diplomat
Mohamed Saloum Bangoura, current Deputy Director General of the Armed Forces Health Service of Guinea
Abdoul Kabèlè Camara, Guinean politician
Arafan Camara, Guinean politician
Makalé Camara, Guinean diplomat
Manga Kindi Camara, the founder of Kindia
M'Balia Camara, Guinean independence activist
Zeinab Camara, Guinean politician
Lansana Conté, former President of Guinea from 1984 to 2008
Seydou Conté, Guinean diplomat
Abdulai Conteh, former Vice president of Sierra Leone
Kandeh Baba Conteh, Sierra Leonean politician
Ahmed Ramadan Dumbuya, Sierra Leonean politician
Dala Modu Dumbuya, was an Important Sierra Leonean-Susu trader during the colonial era
Ibrahima Kassory Fofana, former Prime Minister of Guinea
Mohamed Said Fofana, former Prime Minister of Guinea
Soumaoro Kanté, was a Thirteenth-century king of the Sosso Empire
Domin Konteh, was the leader of the earliest wave of Soso migrants into present-day Sierra Leone
Elhadj Sékhouna Soumah, the Kountigui of costal Guinea
Fodé Soumah, Guinean politician
Sam Mamady Soumah, Guinean politician
Foday Sumah, Sierra Leonean diplomat
Ibrahima Abé Sylla, Guinean politician
M'Mahawa Sylla, Governor of the city of Conakry
Foday Tarawallie, was a Nineteenth-century marabout
Soumba Toumany, was a Yalun-Soso elephant hunter and founded the Kingdom of Dubréka
Facinet Touré, Guinean politician and former soldier of the French colonial army
Fodé Katibi Touré, the founder of Moriah in Forécariah
Kémoko Touré, Guinean politician
Kalémodou Yansané, Guinean politician
Kerfalla Yansané, current Ambassador of Guinea to the United States
Sékou Mouké Yansané, Guinean diplomat
Osman Foday Yansaneh, Sierra Leonean politician
Bountouraby Yattara, Guinean politician
Momodu Yillah, Sierra Leonean politician
Mamady Youla, former Prime minister of Guinea from 2015 to 2018
Nabi Youla, Guinean diplomat
Kandeh Yumkella, Sierra Leonean politician
Mohamed Foday Yumkella, Sierra Leonean politician

Musicians
Amatala, Guinean musician
King Alasko, Guinean musician
Bafodé Bangoura, Guinean musician
Fodé Seydou Bangoura, Guinean drummer
Mohamed Bangoura, Guinean drummer
Yaya Bangoura, Guinean musician
Soul Bang's, Guinean musician
Bangoura Batafon, Guinean musician
Doudou Benny, Guinean musician
Oumar le Blanc, Guinean musician
Lévi Bobo, Guinean musician
Mousto Camara, Guinean musician
Natu Camara, Guinean musician
Petit Camara, Guinean musician
N'nato Camara, Guinean musician
Hamid Chanana, Guinean musician
Daddi Cool, Guinean-reggae musician
Junior Conté, Guinean musician
Fodé Conté, Guinean musician
Ans T Crazy, Guinean musician 
Ousmane Soty Daffé, Guinean musician
King Détruit, Guinean musician
Mohamed Django, Guinean musician
Lasso Doumbouya, Guinean musician
Antoine Flingo, Guinean musician
Fish Killa, Guinean musician
Abdoulaye Korofé, Guinean musician
Sister Lessa, Guinean rapper
RB Tout Locks, Guinean musician
Konko Malela, Guinean rapper
Kader Mafia, Guinean musician
Bouba Menguè, Guinean musician
Dija NGM, Guinean rapper
Lil Sacko, Guinean musician
Bill de Sam, Guinean musician
Abraham Sonty, Guinean musician
Ahmed Soumah, Guinean musician
Alphonse Soumah, Guinean musician
Armand Soumah, Guinean musician
Djibril Soumah, Guinean musician
M'mahawa Soumah, Guinean musician
Momo Wandel Soumah, Guinean musician
N'Fa Moussa Soumah, Guinean musician
Toumany Z Sparta, Guinean musician
Aly Sylla, Guinean musician
Maciré Sylla, Guinean musician
One Time, Guinean musician
Ablos Touré, Guinean musician
Macheté Touré, Guinean musician
Yarie Touré, Guinean musician
Papche Warano, Guinean musician
Alpha Wess, Guinean-reggae musician
Jack Woumpack, Guinean musician
Takana Zion, Guinean-reggae musician

Sportspeople
Abdoul Karim Bangoura, Guinean footballer
Alhassane Bangoura, Guinean footballer
Alkhaly Bangoura, Guinean footballer
Facinet Bangoura, Guinean swimmer
Ibrahima Bangoura, Guinean footballer
Ismaël Bangoura, Guinean footballer
Ismaël Karba Bangoura, Guinean footballer
Kilé Bangoura, Guinean footballer
Lappé Bangoura, Guinean football coach
Mamadama Bangoura, Guinean judoka
Mamadouba Bangoura, Guinean footballer
Mohamed Bangoura, Guinean footballer
Momar Bangoura, French footballer
Ousmane Bangoura, Guinean footballer
Pierre Bangoura, Guinean footballer
Sambégou Bangoura, Guinean footballer
Yady Bangoura, Guinean footballer
Mohamed Bangura, Sierra Leonean footballer
Abdoul Camara, Guinean footballer
Abou Mangué Camara, Guinean footballer
Alsény Camara, Guinean footballer
Alsény Camara, Guinean footballer
Aguibou Camara, Guinean footballer
Dede Camara, Guinean swimmer
Ibrahima Sory Camara, Guinean footballer
Kémoko Camara, Guinean footballer
Mady Camara, Guinean footballer
Naby Camara, Guinean footballer
Souleymane Camara, Senegalese footballer
Abdoulaye Cissé, Guinean footballer
Abdu Conté, Bissau-Guinean footballer
Ibrahima Sory Conté, Guinean footballer
Naby Diarso, Guinean footballer
Boubacar Fofana, Guinean footballer
Ibrahima Sory Sankhon, Guinean footballer
Chérif Souleymane, Guinean footballer
Issiaga Soumah, Guinean footballer
M'mah Soumah, Guinean judoka
Morlaye Soumah, Guinean footballer
Naby Soumah, Guinean footballer
Ndèye Fatou Soumah, Senegalese sprinter
Seydouba Soumah, Guinean footballer
Soriba Soumah, Guinean footballer
Abubakar Suma, Sierra Leonean footballer
Lamin Suma, Sierra Leonean footballer
Sheriff Suma, Sierra Leonean footballer
Abdoul Karim Sylla, Guinean footballer
Idrissa Sylla, Guinean footballer
Issiaga Sylla, Guinean footballer
Kanfory Sylla, Guinean footballer
Mohamed Lamine Sylla, Guinean footballer
Mohamed Ofei Sylla, Guinean footballer
Momo Sylla, Guinean footballer
Morciré Sylla, Guinean footballer
Morlaye Sylla, Guinean footballer
Sekou Oumar Sylla, Guinean footballer
Djibril Fandjé Touré, Guinean footballer
Momo Fanyé Touré, Guinean footballer
Sylla M'Mah Touré, Guinean sprinter
Ibrahima Yattara, Guinean footballer
Mohamed Yattara, Guinean footballer
Naby Yattara, Guinean footballer
Souleymane Youla, Guinean footballer
 Sekou Yansane
 Momo Yansane
 Henri Camara

Actors
Fode Bangoura, Canadian actor
Soumah Mangué, Guinean actor
Prince Modupe, Guinean actor
Souleymane Sylla, Guinean actor

Journalists
Foniké Menguè, Guinean activist and journalist
Harry Yansaneh, Sierra Leonean journalist

Writers
Abdoulaye Ditinn Camara, Guinean writer
Alioum Fantouré, Guinean writer

Other notable people
Mohamed Bentoura Bangoura, Guinean sociologist
Kerfalla Person Camara, Guinean entrepreneur
Tigui Camara, Guinean entrepreneur
Ousmane Conté, Lansana Conté's son
Cheick Yansané, Guinean model

Musical groups
Ideal Black Girls, Guinean rap group
Instinct Killers, Group of artist and dancers
Les Espoirs de Coronthie, Guinean musical group
Les Espoirs de Kakandé, Guinean musical group
Les Étoiles de Boulbinet, Guinean musical group
Les Messagers de Boulbinet, Guinean musical group

References

 
Indigenous peoples of West Africa
Ethnic groups in Guinea
Ethnic groups in Sierra Leone
Mandé people
Muslim communities in Africa
West African people
Female genital mutilation
Female genital mutilation by country